Francesco de Estrada (1599–1671) was a Roman Catholic prelate who served as Archbishop of Brindisi (1569–1671).

Biography
Francesco de Estrada was born in Montilla, Spain in 1599.
On 28 July 1659, he was appointed during the papacy of Pope Alexander VII as Archbishop of Brindisi.
On 17 August 1659, he was consecrated bishop by Marcantonio Franciotti, Cardinal-Priest of Santa Maria della Pace, with Stefano Quaranta, Archbishop of Amalfi, and Francisco Suárez de Villegas, Titular Bishop of Memphis, serving as co-consecrators. 
He served as Archbishop of Brindisi until his death on 23 November 1671.

References 

17th-century Roman Catholic archbishops in the Kingdom of Naples
Bishops appointed by Pope Alexander VII
1599 births
1671 deaths